Devora Radeva (born April 23, 1992 in Sofia, Bulgaria) is a Bulgarian figure skater. She is a two season competitor on the Junior Grand Prix circuit. She competed at the 2006 Junior Grand Prix Final because it was held in Sofia and the Bulgarian federation was given a wildcard entry. Radeva finished ninth.

External links
 

Bulgarian female single skaters
1992 births
Living people
Figure skaters from Sofia